Gunnr (alternatively guðr) is an Old Norse term meaning "battle". It is the name of a  valkyrie in Norse mythology, and was also used as a feminine given name. The modern forms Gun and Gunn remain in use as a feminine given name in Scandinavia.
The word is from Proto-Germanic *gunþiz, which is a common element of Germanic names not only in North but also in West Germanic, as second element especially frequent in feminine names (as in Hildegund), as first element also in masculine names (as in Gunther).

The earliest attestation of the name is on the Rök Stone where it occurs as part of a kenning for wolf:
Þat sagum tvalfta, hvar hæstʀ se Gunnaʀ etu vettvangi a, kunungaʀ tvaiʀ tigiʀ svað a liggia.
"I say this the twelfth, where the horse of Gunnr sees fodder on the battlefield, where twenty kings lie."

Valkyrie
Gunnr is also mentioned in the Völuspá in a list of valkyries, Gunnr, Hildr, Göndul / ok Geirskögul.
The Darraðarljóð gives Guðr as one of six names of valkyries.

In the Prose Edda Gunnr is singled out along with Róta and Skuld as one of the valkyries who always ride out to choose the slain and decide battles:
Guðr ok Róta ok norn in yngsta, er Skuld heitir, ríða jafnan at kjósa val ok ráða vígum.

References

Valkyries